Hedinichthys grummorum is a species of stone loach in the genus Hedinichthys. It is endemic to China. This species reaches a length of

References

grummorum
Freshwater fish of China
Endemic fauna of China
Taxa named by Artem Mikhailovich Prokofiev
Fish described in 2010